An influenza epidemic in Gold Coast (Modern day Ghana) in 1918–1919, which killed more than 100,000 people in six months. Globally, 20 million people died from the outbreak in 1918. In the local parlance it was called "mfruensa" by the unschooled members of the society

Influenza 
Influenza is a respiratory disease that primarily affects the lungs, nose, and mouth. In 1918-1919 epidemic killed approximately 2% of Africa's total population. The Gold Coast Influenza strain was a genetic mutation of a virus in the region known as swine influenza. The people living in the Gold Coast area had never come in contact with the new strain of influenza, so nobody was considered immune. Being completely unprepared for a full-scale epidemic due to war preparations, the Gold Coast was left understaffed and financially burdened.

Influenza Hits the Gold Coast 
There was a previous pandemic of 1889-1893 which reached the Gold Coast in 1891. However, it did not prepare the Coast for the epidemic that spread through the region in the 1910s.

The governor of Sierra Leone sent a message to the governor of Ghana on 28 August 1918 of an influenza outbreak and measures are to be taken because vessels coming from Accra or Sierra Leone are infected. The message arrived late. The American vessel S.S Shonga arrived in Cape Coast on August 31, 1918. The spread of the influenza virus caused schools, Mosques and Churches to close down.  It is recorded that an estimated 100,00 people died of symptoms related to influenza out of the 1,504,000 recorded in 1911 census. Because the Gold Coast was experiencing a dry season in the Northern area, residents were at a greater risk for infection, hence the higher mortality rate. The only reported attempts to slow the spread of disease on behalf of the government involved quarantines, but it was not strictly enforced enough to put a quick end to the epidemic. It wasn't until 1950 that doctors found a vaccine that fought the strain, more than 30 years after the spread.

The whole colony by 1919 had 43 government  physicians; 5 of them were administrators and 5 were vacant position. The government boys' school was now the hospital with a Principal Medical officer who was given  500 pounds to care for the sick. After recording several fatalities they were buried in a single grave regardless of the strong African criticisms at the height of the epidemic.

Dates of Recorded Cases 

The table indicates the city and date they recorded their first case of the virus

References 

Influenza pandemics
History of Ghana
20th-century epidemics